Oscar Langone (born 30 March 1953) is an Argentinian former professional football player for Club Atlético Banfield in Argentina's Primera Division.

Early life 
Oscar Langone was born on 30 March 1958, in Buenos Aires, Argentina. In 1977, he moved with his family to Australia.

Club career
He spent the part of the 1970s playing in Australia's National Soccer League. His coaching career began in 1994, when he was hired by Capital Football to coach their junior representative teams. He was promoted as head coach for Canberra City FC, where he spent the next nine years managing some of the top state premier football clubs, academies and representative teams. In 2005, he was hired by the Football Federation Australia under the guidance of FFA technical director and head coach Guus Hiddink for Australia's 2005 World Cup Qualifying campaign.

Coaching career

 1994–1995: Capital Football, Representative Coach
 1996–1997: Canberra City Football Club, Head Coach
 1998–1999: Majura Junior Club, Capital Football League Head Coach
 2000–2001: Belconnen United, Capital Football League Head Coach
 2003–2004: Belconnen Blue Devils, N.S.W. Premier League
 2005: Football Federation of Australia, Scout
 2006–2007: Musgrave Soccer Club, Gold Coast Premier League Head Coach
 2008: Gold Coast Soccer, Representative Coach
 2009–2010: Gold Coast United, Hyundai "A" League Match Analyst
 2012: Gold Coast Stars, Head Coach
 2013: Palm Beach NPL, Head Coach
 2014: Merrimac FC, Gold Coast Premier League Head Coach

References

1958 births
Living people
Argentine emigrants to Australia
Australian soccer coaches